Sophie de Renneville or Madame de Renneville, was the pen name of Sophie de Senneterre, who was born in Senneterre, Caen, France in 1772 and died in Paris in 1822 at 50. She was a writer, editor and journalist.

Biography 
Sophie was born the Marquise de Senneterre into French nobility in Normandy, and she took up writing to support her family, which had been financially ruined during the French Revolution. Using a pen name to assure anonymity, she published many books intended for young people, some of which have been translated, such as Charles and Eugenia (1926) in English, or Savinianito, o Historia de un joven huérfano (English: Savinianito, or Story of a young orphan) (1820) in Spanish, and the Dot, which was translated into Russian. The primary themes of her books included the proper role of young girls in good society, moral stories and history.

In addition to her writings for children, she also published politically engaging works for adults such as Life of Saint Clotilde, Queen of France, wife of the Great Clovis, followed by a précis mixed with anecdotes, concerning the mores and customs of the first centuries of the French monarchy (1809).

Feminist 
In addition to her books, Renneville was also editor of the feminist periodical Athénée des dames which confronted the masculine-centered ideas of the French society of her time and provided female readers with a forum to voice alternative perspectives.

Her writings provided a common ground that allowed her audiences, even those who read her work in the years following Renneville's death, to campaign for better and more fair treatment by society at large. According to Karen Offen, she had a profound effect on another feminist, Henriette Wild. "The author's [Henriette's] focus on the sage femme, which renders in English both as 'midwife' and as 'wise woman,' is significant; a key issue in Parisian women's protest in the 1840s was the admission of women to the study of medicine and, more generally, to higher learning, to savoir or learned knowledge. The book referred to [by Henriette] by the much published Mme de Renneville (née Sophie de Senneterre) is doubtless her Biographie des femmes Ulustres de Rome, de la Grèce et du Bas-Empire (Paris: Parmantier, 1825)."In that book by Renneville, her female protagonist named Agnodice from Athens, decided to dressed as a man so she could attend "the famous school of Herophilus to study medicine and especially the art of midwifery." After opening her own practice, she proved to be a popular physician but, when she was unmasked, was condemned by her male colleagues by "invoking the law that denied her the right to practice medicine." But the outcry from Agnodice's patients, and the greater female community, caused the law to be overturned. In 19th century France, readers popularized the book and bemoaned the fact that Renneville's heroine was only fiction.

Selected publications 
According to WorldCat, Renneville has 288 works in 700 publications in 5 languages and 1,296 library holdings worldwide, as of 2020.
Vie de Ste Clotilde, reine de France, femme du grand Clovis, suivie d’un Précis mêlé d’anecdotes, concernant les mœurs et coutumes des premiers siècles de la monarchie française, Paris, Villet, 1809
Biographie des femmes illustres : de Rome, de la Grèce et du Bas-Empire, Paris, Parmantier, 1825
À bas la Cabale. Par un anonyme qui n’a jamais vu Buonaparte, Paris, Pierre Blanchard, 1814
 Adèle & Justine, ou, Histoires d’une grand’ tante, Paris, Lavigne, 1900
 Amusements de l’adolescence, ou, Lectures instructives et agréables à l’usage des deux sexes, Paris, Nepveu, 1815
 Antony, ou La conscience : suivi de petites histoires morales et instructives, Paris, Lavigne, 1838
 Beautés de l’histoire du jeune âge : ouvrage propre à inspirer aux jeunes gens l’amour de leur devoir et de toutes les vertus, Paris, Thierot et Berlin, 1823
Contes à ma petite fille et à mon petit garçon : pour les amuser, leur former un bon cœur, et les corriger des petits défauts de leur âge, Paris, Saintin, 1817
 Contes pour les enfans de cinq à six ans, Paris, Blanchard, 1829
 Conversations d’une petite fille avec sa poupée ; suivies de L’histoire de la poupée, Paris, Billois, 1813
 Correspondance de deux petites filles : ouvrage propre à former de bonne heure les enfans au style épistolaire, Paris, Belin Le Prieur, 1811
 Coutumes gauloises : ou, origines curieuses et peu connues de la plupart de nos usages, Paris, Lavigne, 1834
 Éducation de la poupée, ou Petits dialogues instructifs et moraux, à la portée du jeune âge, Paris, A. Eymery, 1822
 Éducation par l’histoire, ou école des jeunes gens : contenant des modèles de toutes les vertus du premier ordre, pris parmi les français de différentes classes ; extraits des ouvrages de Rollin, Bossuet, Fénélon, l’abbé Barthélemy, et autres auteurs célèbres, Paris, Genets jeune, 1820
 Galerie des femmes vertueuses, ou Leçons de morale, à l’usage des demoiselles, Paris, Le Prieur, 1808
 Galerie des jeunes vierges, ou, Modèle des vertus qui assurent le bonheur des femmes : ouvrage destiné aux jeunes personnes de tous les états : où l’on prouve, par des exemples, qu’un cœur pur est le premier des biens : qu’il est le garant de toutes les vertus chrétiennes et des qualités sociales : que l’innocence de mœurs appelée sagesse fait la bonne fille, l’épouse respectable, ainsi que la bonne mère : qu’enfin, elle assure aux femmes des jours heureux jusque dans la vieillesse la plus avancée, Paris, Thiérot et Belin, 1824
 La fée bienfaisante, ou, La mère ingénieuse, Paris, A. Eymery, 1814
 La mère gouvernante, ou Principes de politesse fondés sur les qualités du cœur, Paris, Belin-Le Prieur, 1812
 Le Conteur moraliste : ou, Le bonheur par la vertu. Contes, Paris, Belin-Leprieur, 1820
 Le livre des enfants laborieux ; ou, petits tableaux des principales connaissances mises à la portée des enfants : suivis de fables et de petits contes amusans et instructifs, Paris, A. Eymery, 1824
 Le livre du second âge, dédié aux pères et mères de famille ; contenant, en abrégé, les articles qui suivent: religion, ancien testament, sphère, géographie, troisième race des rois de France, quadrupèdes, mythologie, et des contes, Paris, Lavigne, 1836
 Le Petit Philippe, ou, l’Émulation excitée par l’amour filial, Paris, Brianchon, 1824
 Le petit Savinien, ou, Histoire d’un jeune orphelin, Paris, Genets jeune, 1815
 Le précepteur des enfans, ou Livre du second âge, dédié aux pères et mères de famille; contenant, en abrégé, les articles qui suivant: religion, Ancien Testament, grammaire, sphère, géographie, troisième race des rois de France; quadrupèdes, mythologie, et des contes, Paris, Ledoux et Tenré, 1818
 Le retour des vendanges ; contes moraux et instructifs à la portée des enfants de différents ages, Paris, chez Genets jeune, libraire, 14 rue Dauphine, 1820
 Le réveil de Napoléon; ou, Les destins de la France accomplis, Paris, Delaunay, 1815
 L’école chrétienne, Paris, Thomine, 1800
 Les aventures de Télamon ou, Les Athéniens sous la monarchie, Paris, Villet, 1819
 Les bons petits enfants contes et dialogues pour le jeune âge, Limoges : Ardant, 1882
 Les deux éducations : ou, Le pouvoir de l’exemple, Paris, Eymery, 1813
 Les enfants de quinze ans, Paris, Lebailly, 1842
 Les espiègleries de l’enfance : ou, L’indulgence maternelle. Contes et historiettes propres à être donnés aux enfans de l’âge de six à huit ans, Paris, Nadau, 1824
 Les fagots de monsieur Croque-Mitaine : contes pour les petits enfants, Paris, Genets, 1821
 Les récréations d’Eugénie, contes propres à former le cœur et à développer la raison des enfans, Paris, Genets jeune, 1815
 Lettres d’Octavie, jeune pensionnaire de la maison de Saint-Clair : ou, Essai sur l’éducation des demoiselles, Paris, Villet, 1818
 Miss Lovely de Macclesfield, ou, Le domino noir, Paris, Mme Ve Lepetit, 1811
 Mythologie de la jeunesse. Ornée d’un grand nombre de gravures, Paris, Bellavoine 1822
 Nouvelle mythologie du jeune âge, Paris, Genets Jeune, 1822
 Palmyre; ou, L’Éducation de l’Expérience, Paris, Parmentier, 1823
 Parafaragaramus, ou, Croquignole et sa famille : folie dédiée aux écoliers, Paris, Ledoux et Tenré, 1817
 Polichinelle instituteur : sur le théâtre duquel on voit figurer Mlle. Fanferluche, Rustaud, Mr. Brise-Ménage, & a., & a., Paris, Genets, 1817
 Récréations instructives et amusantes, ou, Choix d’historiettes morales tirées des ouvrages de Mesdames de Choiseul, de Renneville, Jauffret et al., à l’usage de la jeunesse, Philadelphie : H. Perkins, 1835
 Stanislas, roi de Pologne, roman historique, suivi d’un abrégé de l’histoire de Pologne et de Lorraine, Paris, C. Villet, 1807
 Veillées d’hiver, Lyon, Gilbertson et Brun, 1840

References 

1772 births
1822 deaths
19th-century French women writers
Writers from Paris
French marquesses
French people of Norman descent
19th-century French historians
French women journalists
French feminist writers